Dick Cross Wildlife Management Area is a  Wildlife Management Area in Mecklenburg County, Virginia. Formerly known as the Elm Hill Wildlife Management Area, it sits on the north side of the Roanoke River just below the John H. Kerr Dam. Much of the land was once used to support the farming of cattle, and some evidence of this remains. Around  of the area includes impounded wetlands specifically managed for waterfowl.

Dick Cross Wildlife Management Area is owned and maintained by the Virginia Department of Game and Inland Fisheries. The area is open to the public for hunting, trapping, fishing, hiking, horseback riding, and primitive camping. Bird dog field trials are held at the property, which includes a number of kennels for that use. An observation tower near the area's wetlands provides opportunities to observe wildlife, including bald eagles that are known to overwinter in the area. Access for persons 17 years of age or older requires a valid hunting or fishing permit, or a WMA access permit.

See also
 List of Virginia Wildlife Management Areas

References

External links
Virginia Department of Game and Inland Fisheries: Dick Cross Wildlife Management Area

Wildlife management areas of Virginia
Protected areas of Mecklenburg County, Virginia